Humberto Honorio (born 21 July 1983), is a Brazilian born, Italian futsal player who plays for Italservice and the Italian national futsal team.

References

External links 
 UEFA profile

1983 births
Living people
Italian men's futsal players
Brazilian emigrants to Italy
Luparense Calcio a 5 players